"Leave Right Now" is a song written by British singer-songwriter Will Young. It was written by Eg White and produced by Stephen Lipson for his second studio album, Friday's Child (2003). A song about unrequited love, it was released as the album's first single, becoming another number-one hit on the Irish and the UK Singles Chart.

White was awarded the Ivor Novello Award for Best Song Musically and Lyrically for "Leave Right Now" in 2004. The song was later also included on the international version of Young's third album, Keep On (2005). It also served as the exit song for the ninth season of American Idol. Young performed it on the penultimate episode to accompany a video montage recapping the season on 25 May 2010.

Critical reception
Stylus Magazine, who were mostly mixed to negative for Young's previous number ones, rated "Leave Right Now" with 9/10, saying "Better. Much, much better. By this time Will was comfortable as a popstar, prepared to add a little WTF to his videos (here he has a fight with the viewer in an art gallery), and had his style down pat: jacket and jeans rocked to a level not seen since Lovejoy and Tinker were bossing things in the late 80s. He had songs to match as well: 'Leave Right Now' is just one of the most English songs ever, which is understandable: what could be more English than a privately educated homosexual? The guy's a moderate genius—Dido with testicles and a heart." In 2007, Freaky Trigger ranked the song at number 54 in their list of the "Top 100 Songs of All Time," with critic Pete Baran calling it "one of the ballsiest songs of the noughties." In 2020, The Guardian ranked "Leave Right Now" at number 74 in its list of "The 100 greatest UK No 1 singles".

Commercial performance
The single went to number one in the UK Singles Chart and stayed there for two weeks, selling 117,702 copies in its first week. As of December 2018, the single had sold 638,000 copies, (728,000 including streaming equivalent sales). The song has sold 50,000 copies in the United States according to Billboard, with 32,000 of those occurring the week he performed on American Idol.

Music video
A music video for "Leave Right Now" was directed by Kevin Godley. The clip, which has no transitions and features actress Kelly Wenham as one of the party guests, features Young at a party where a fight starts and he gets caught up in it.

Track listings

Credits and personnel

Tracey Ackerman – backing vocals
Steve Barney – drums
Anne Dudley – orchestra arranger
Stephen Lipson – producer, programming
Heff Moraes – mixing engineer

John Themis – guitar
Greg Wells – keyboards
Eg White – protools
Will Young – guitar, vocals, writer

Charts

Weekly charts

Year-end charts

Decade-end charts

Certifications

Release history

Cover versions
In 2005, "Leave Right Now" was parodied by Mario Rosenstock for the radio show Gift Grub, whose identically titled version poked fun at Roy Keane's controversial departure from Manchester United and his falling-out with Alex Ferguson. Rosenstock's version also reached number one on the Irish Singles Chart.
In 2005, "Leave Right Now" was covered in French by Pierrick Lilliu as "La même erreur" on his 2005 debut album, Besoin d'espace.
In 2005, actor Peter Gallagher recorded a version for his album 7 Days in Memphis.
In 2013, Australian artist Anthony Callea recorded a version for his album, Thirty.
In 2018,  English musical theatre actor Lee Mead recorded a version for his album 10 Year Anniversary.

References

External links
 

19 Recordings singles
2003 singles
2003 songs
2010 singles
Bertelsmann Music Group singles
Irish Singles Chart number-one singles
Number-one singles in Scotland
RCA Records singles
Song recordings produced by Stephen Lipson
Songs written by Eg White
Syco Music singles
UK Singles Chart number-one singles
Will Young songs